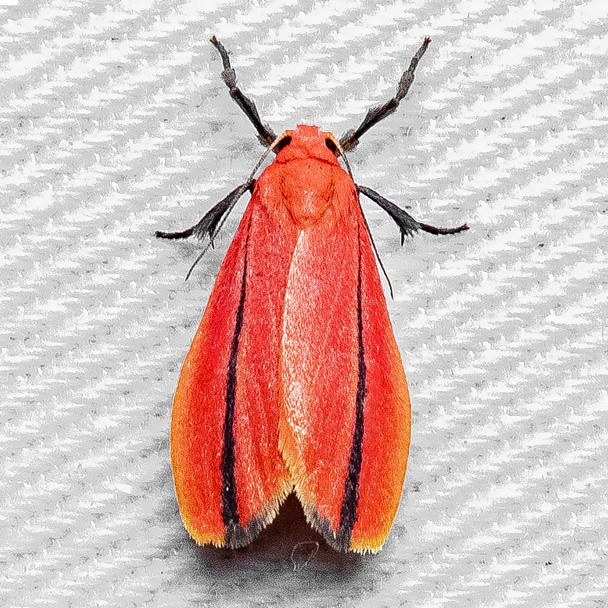
- Coccinigripennis nangkwak

Scientific classification
- Kingdom: Animalia
- Phylum: Arthropoda
- Clade: Pancrustacea
- Class: Insecta
- Order: Lepidoptera
- Superfamily: Noctuoidea
- Family: Erebidae
- Subfamily: Arctiinae
- Tribe: Lithosiini
- Genus: Coccinigripennis; Volynkin & Hung, 2019

= Coccinigripennis =

Genus of moths

Coccinigripennis is a genus in the moth family Erebidae. There are about seven species described in the genus Coccinigripennis, which are found from the Himalayas and northern Myanmar to southern China and northern Indochina.

== Species ==
These seven species belong to the genus Coccinigripennis:

- Coccinigripennis anomala (Elwes, 1890)
- Coccinigripennis fansipana (Volynkin & Černý, 2017)
- Coccinigripennis incompletostriga (Volynkin & Černý, 2017)
- Coccinigripennis lisu (Huang & Volynkin, 2020)
- Coccinigripennis miloslavae (Černý, 2016)
- Coccinigripennis nangkwak (Volynkin & Černý, 2017)
- Coccinigripennis rawanga (Volynkin & Černý, 2017)
